Tulva is a Finnish language feminist magazine in Helsinki, Finland, which is published three times annually. The magazine has been in circulation since 2002. Tero Kartastenpää was one of the former editors-in-chief of the magazine, which is published by the Feminist Association Union. He served in the post between 2016 and late 2019. As of 2020 the editor-in-chief is Riikka Pennanen.

Tulva is the recipient of the 2006 Quality Magazine Award.

References

External links
 

2002 establishments in Finland
Feminism in Finland
Feminist magazines
Finnish-language magazines
Magazines established in 2002
Magazines published in Helsinki
Triannual magazines
Women's magazines published in Finland